The Amogh Carbine (Amogh means Unerring) is a select-fire personal defense weapon designed & manufactured by Ordnance Factories Board. It is a derivative of the Excalibur rifle, which in turn is a development of the INSAS rifle.

The Amogh has been designed for close quarters operations.

History
The Amogh was developed in 2005.

In September 2008, an order was made to supply 148 Amoghs for a cost of 26.64 lakh. An audit revealed in September 2009 that 80 of the carbines were not used due to failure for supplying the needed ammunition for eight years.

The carbine was shown to visit during the Aero India 2013 convention.

It has been rejected to be used by the Indian Army after the first trial, although the Indian Coast Guard, navy and some police forces use the carbine.

The carbine was featured in an Indian postage stamp from 25 March 2012.

Design 
The carbine was developed by the Ordnance Factory Board and is chambered in 5.56×30mm MINSAS caliber specially developed for carbine role, similar to the MSMC. It is a gas operated, long stroke piston with a rotating bolt. Weight of the carbine is 2.95 kg without magazine and has an effective range of 200m along with a rate of fire of 700 rpm.

The receiver is made up of stamped sheet metal, while the hand-guard, pistol grip and side folding stock are made up of black colour, light weight polymer material. It has a 330mm long chrome plated barrel. Feed system is through a 30-round polymer magazine which is translucent to allow the shooter to know the number of rounds left in it. Charging handle is located at the left side of receiver. Magazine release is similar to that of INSAS rifle with magazine catch lever located at the front of the trigger guard.

It has two firing mode single and auto. The carbine has fixed iron sights with front sight (post type) and rear sight (aperture type), there is a small rail on the top cover, which allows the mounting of various optical sights. It has provision of bayonet as an accessory.

Operators

Indian Navy
Indian Coast Guard
Manipur Police
Uttar Pradesh Police

See also
 Colt MARS
 Modern Sub Machine Carbine

References

External links
 

Firearms of India
5.56 mm firearms
Rifles of India
Carbines
Personal defense weapons